Kuami Agboh (born 28 December 1977) is a Togolese former professional footballer who played as a defensive midfielder. He made five appearances for the Togo national team in 2005 and 2006.

Club career
Born in Tsévié, Togo, Agboh is an AJ Auxerre youth product.

In November 2004, having left Grenoble Foot 38 in the summer, he trialled with Ligue 2 side Stade Brestois 29. Also in 2004, he went on trial with Norwegian club Viking FK.

In February 2005, he trialled with Assyriska FF of the Allsvenskan.

In January 2007, Agboh moved to Finnish club Myllykosken Pallo −47 from K.S.K. Beveren on a two-year contract.

International career
Agboh represented France at junior level, winning 1996 European Under-19 Football Championship and playing in 1997 FIFA World Youth Championship.

Agboh made his senior debut against Paraguay on 11 November 2005. He was a member of the Togo national team, and was called up to the 2006 World Cup in Germany.

Post-playing career
From 2009 to 2013, Agboh worked as a coach at former club AJ Auxerre.

In July 2013, he joined lower-league club Appoigny.

References

External links

1977 births
Living people
People from Maritime Region
Togolese emigrants to France
Togolese footballers
French footballers
Association football midfielders
Togo international footballers
France youth international footballers
France under-21 international footballers
2006 FIFA World Cup players
Ligue 1 players
Ligue 2 players
Belgian Pro League players
Veikkausliiga players
AJ Auxerre players
Grenoble Foot 38 players
K.S.K. Beveren players
Myllykosken Pallo −47 players
Togolese expatriate footballers
Togolese expatriate sportspeople in France
Expatriate footballers in France
Togolese expatriate sportspeople in Belgium
Expatriate footballers in Belgium
Togolese expatriate sportspeople in Finland
Expatriate footballers in Finland